Kalamazoo Kingdom were an American soccer team, founded in 1996. The team was a member of the United Soccer Leagues Premier Development League (PDL), the fourth tier of the American Soccer Pyramid, until 2006, when the team left the league and the franchise was terminated.

The Kingdom folded their franchise at the end of the 2006 season to re-focus their efforts on youth soccer in the Kalamazoo area, specifically supporting their teams for the Super Y-League, as well as their own indoor soccer league.

They played their home games at Mayor's Riverfront Stadium in Kalamazoo, Michigan. The team's colors were red, white and black.

Year-by-year

Competition History

Coaches
  Stu Riddle 2006

Stadia
 Mayor's Riverfront Stadium, Kalamazoo, Michigan 2003–06
 McCamley Field, Portage, Michigan 2003–04, 2006 (4 games)
 Stadium at Mattawan High School, Mattawan, Michigan 2006 (1 game)

Average Attendance
 2006: 442
 2005: 701

See also
 Kalamazoo Outrage

External links
Kalamazoo Kingdom

Soccer clubs in Michigan
Defunct Premier Development League teams
Sports in Kalamazoo, Michigan
Association football clubs established in 1996
Association football clubs disestablished in 2006
1996 establishments in Michigan
2006 disestablishments in Michigan